Her Corporal ( or ) is a 1956 Austrian historical comedy film directed by E. W. Emo and starring Peter Weck, and Paul Hörbiger.

The film's sets were designed by the art director Heinz Ockermüller. The film was shot in Agfacolor at the Schönbrunn Studios in Vienna.

Cast

References

Bibliography

External links 
 

1956 films
Austrian historical comedy films
1950s historical comedy films
1950s German-language films
Films directed by E. W. Emo
Schönbrunn Studios films
Films scored by Hans Lang
Films set in the 19th century
Military humor in film
Films set in Austria-Hungary